The University of Palencia was the first university of Spain. It was founded by Alfonso VIII at the request of Bishop Tello Téllez de Meneses. It was the model upon which the University of Salamanca was patterned.

Study began to flourish in Palencia and men notable for their virtue and science came from its schools, among them Saint Julian of Cuenca, Saint Dominic, and Saint Peter González Telmo; hence the adage: "En Palencia armas y ciencia" (In Palencia arms and science).

The university was founded about 1212, shortly after the aforesaid victory at "Las Navas de Tolosa" (others say in 1208), and the king summoned from France and Italy noted teachers of various arts and sciences, retaining them in Palencia on large salaries.

Saint Dominic, the founder of the Dominican Order, regarded Palencia as his alma mater, having been mentored there by Don Diego d'Azevedo (Diego de Acebo) [Didacus d'Azebes].

The death of the founder in 1214, the minority of Henry I, and the growth of its fortunate rival, Salamanca, caused the decay of Palencia, many of whose professors and students went to Salamanca, whence the erroneous belief of a transfer of the university to the latter place.

In 1243 Archbishop Rodrigo records that in spite of unpropitious events, study continued in Palencia and that the cardinal legate, Juan de Abbeville, in a Council of Valladolid (1228) had endeavoured to revive it. Bishop Fernando obtained from Urban IV (14 May 1263) a Bull granting to the professors and students of Palencia all the privileges of the University of Paris.

But lack of financial support and the proximity of the prosperous University of Salamanca made a revival of Palencia impossible, and it died out before the end of the 13th century, probably in 1264, at which time the university was definitely transferred to Valladolid. It was Bishop Telo who also established convents of the Dominicans and Franciscans; the former was famous for the striking conversion of St. Peter González Telmo.

See also
University of Valladolid
 List of medieval universities

References

, http://www.newadvent.org/cathen/11417c.htm

Palencia, University of
Palencia